South Korean girl group Blackpink has performed in two concert tours (one of which have been worldwide), two one-day concerts and one fan meeting since their debut in August 2016. In July 2017, Blackpink held their debut Japanese showcase at the Nippon Budokan in Tokyo in front of 14,000 fans.  The group's first concert tour commenced in July 2018 with their Blackpink Arena Tour, which held 8 shows throughout Japan and attracted 125,000 spectators. In November of that year, Blackpink embarked on their first worldwide concert tour, titled "In Your Area" in Seoul. The tour saw 36 shows in 17 countries across Asia, North America, Europe and Oceania. The tour garnered a record-breaking amount of attendees and has been regarded as the most successful concert tour conducted by a K-pop girl group.


Concert tours

One-off concerts

Virtual concerts

Fanmeetings

Music festivals

Award shows

TV shows and specials

Other live performances

References

 
Lists of concert tours
Lists of concert tours of South Korean artists